On April 28, 2015, the Supreme Court of the United States heard oral arguments for Obergefell v. Hodges (Ohio), which was consolidated with three other same-sex marriage cases from the other states in the Sixth Circuit: Tanco v. Haslam (Tennessee), DeBoer v. Snyder (Michigan), Bourke v. Beshear (Kentucky). On June 26, 2015 the Supreme Court reversed the Sixth Circuit's decision, paving the way for same-sex marriage to become legal in those states, and setting a precedent for the entire nation. All four states complied with the ruling the same day it was issued before the mandate was actually issued. Every state in the circuit had a district court ruling against their states' ban, but they were eventually stayed pending appeal. The Sixth Circuit consists of Kentucky, Michigan, Ohio, and Tennessee. On August 6, 2014, the Sixth Circuit heard oral arguments for same-sex marriage cases from each state within the circuit. On November 6, 2014, the Sixth Circuit in a split 2-1 decision, upheld the states' same-sex marriage bans, reversing the district courts' rulings that struck them down. The Sixth Circuit was the first and only circuit court since the landmark ruling United States v. Windsor to uphold the constitutionality of states' same-sex marriage bans which caused a circuit split.

Prior to the Supreme Court's ruling in Obergefell, same-sex marriages were neither performed nor recognized in Kentucky (with the exception of a divorce that was granted to a same-sex couple). However, recognition of out-of-state same-sex marriage was technically legal for a brief amount of time when a federal judge overturned part of the state's ban on same-sex marriage. This ruling was stayed the following day. Recognition of same-sex relationships (marriages under that name or any other) have been banned by the state constitution since 2004. The state's ban was struck down entirely on 1 July 2014 and was stayed pending appeal.

Michigan's state constitution bans recognition of same-sex unions in any form following a 2004 popular vote. Same-sex marriage in Michigan was ruled legal on March 21, 2014 by the U.S. District Court for Michigan's Eastern District. More than 300 same-sex couples were married in Michigan on Saturday, March 22, 2014, but a stay against enforcement of the ruling was issued late that same day until March 26. On March 25, 2014, a federal appeals court stayed the ruling indefinitely. The same-sex marriages that were performed that day are currently recognized.

On April 14, 2014, U.S. District Judge Timothy S. Black ruled that Ohio had to recognize same-sex marriages performed in other jurisdictions Two days later he stayed enforcement of his ruling except for the birth certificates sought by the plaintiffs.

On March 14, 2014, U.S. District Judge Aleta Trauger granted a preliminary injunction requiring Tennessee to recognize the marriages of the three plaintiff couples. On April 25, 2014, the Sixth Circuit, in an unpublished per curiam order, issued a stay of the district court's decision in Tanco, and ordered that the case be assigned to a panel of judges on the Sixth Circuit for expedited consideration on the merits.

See also
Same-sex marriage
Same-sex marriage in the United States
Same-sex marriage in the Tenth Circuit
Same-sex marriage in the Fourth Circuit
Same-sex marriage in the Seventh Circuit
Same-sex marriage in the Ninth Circuit

References

United States Court of Appeals for the Sixth Circuit
6